Life Is but a Dream... is the upcoming eighth studio album by American heavy metal band Avenged Sevenfold, scheduled for release on June 2, 2023, through Warner Records. Its release is scheduled to come nearly seven years after its predecessor, The Stage (2016), marking the longest gap between studio albums for the band to date. Similar to The Stage, Life Is but a Dream... was produced by the band with Joe Barresi.

Production 
Writing and recording for Life Is but a Dream... began in 2018 and commenced in 2022. Much of the album was written by the end of 2020, though the COVID-19 pandemic prolonged the album's recording stage, primarily due to concerns about traveling during the pandemic. The band also expressed dissatisfaction towards the idea of releasing the album without being able to promote it with a tour. The album was considered by Avenged Sevenfold singer M. Shadows to be 70 percent complete in February 2021, with items such as mixing and recording orchestral sections still remaining. The recording of the orchestral sections were finished in February 2022, with drummer Brooks Wackerman touting on social media that the album was now 90 percent complete. Andy Wallace, the band's longtime mixer, finished mixing the album in September 2022, with Wackerman stating on social media that the album would now be ready for release in 2023. The album was inspired by the writing and philosophy of Albert Camus.

Promotion and release 
Avenged Sevenfold began teasing new material in February 2023 with an online scavenger hunt that began with their social media accounts being supposedly hacked, claiming that certain upcoming appearances at music festivals were canceled. The scavenger hunt was centered around a Reddit user named "Libad5343", the suspected hacker of the band's social media accounts, and their blog, which included articles written with ChatGPT and images generated by DALL-E 2. Eventually, one of the clues featured coordinates leading to The Ritz, a music venue in San Jose, California, which had "Libad5343 Presents Nobody" written on its signage, with a hidden phrase instructing people to meet at the venue at midnight on March 6, 2023. Upon the scavenger hunt being completed, fans were rewarded with an unlisted YouTube video that had a countdown set for 8 a.m. PT on March 14. Soon after, the band confirmed the legitimacy of the countdown video. The lead single, "Nobody", was released on March 14, accompanied by a stop motion music video directed by Chris Hopewell. On the same day, the band also revealed the details for Life Is but a Dream..., including its release date and cover art, which was designed by Wes Lang.

Life Is but a Dream... is scheduled for release on June 2, 2023, through Warner Records in both digital and physical formats. It will be Avenged Sevenfold's first studio album to be released through Warner since Hail to the King (2013), as they released The Stage (2016) through Capitol Records following a legal battle with Warner Music. Life Is but a Dream... includes 11 different color variations for its vinyl release, most of which are exclusive to a respective retailer.

Track listing

Personnel 
Avenged Sevenfold
 M. Shadows – lead vocals
 Zacky Vengeance – rhythm guitar, backing vocals
 Synyster Gates – lead guitar, backing vocals
 Johnny Christ – bass, backing vocals
 Brooks Wackerman – drums

Production
 Joe Barresi – production
 Andy Wallace – mixing
 Wes Lang – cover art

References 

Avenged Sevenfold albums
2023 albums
Albums postponed due to the COVID-19 pandemic
Upcoming albums
Warner Records albums